Colubrina elliptica, also known as mabi or soldierwood, is a species of flowering tree in the family Rhamnaceae that is native to the Florida Keys, the Caribbean, Central America, Mexico, and Venezuela.

Description 
It produces fruit the size of peppercorns; when ripe, the fruits explode, shooting their seeds for several feet away and making explosions sound like rounds of musket fire, hence the name "soldierwood". It is also called "nakedwood", due to its smooth bark with peels. The tree can grow very large, with a trunk circumference as large as 33 inches, a height of 47 feet tall, and with a tree crown spread 26 feet according to the American Forests Register of Champion Trees.

Ecology 
This tree is recognized not only for its size but also the critical ecosystem services that it provides, such as food and shelter for wildlife, its water purification abilities, and its role in absorbing  from the atmosphere and storing carbon in its wood.

Uses
Colubrina elliptica is a saponin-containing plant widely distributed in the Caribbean region where its bark is used for the preparation of bitter beverages and in folk medicine for treatment of skin diseases. The bark and leaves of mabi are used to create mauby, a drink popular in the Caribbean.

Chemistry 
In recent years, three new bitter saponins, designated mabioside A, B and C, were isolated from the bark of Colubrina elliptica and were determined to be 3-O-[alpha-JL-rhamnopyranosyl-(1 --> 6)-beta-D-glucopyranosyl]-15-O-[beta-D- glucopyranosyl] mabiogenin, 3-O-{alpha-L-rhamnopyranosyl-(1 --> 6)-[beta-D-glucopyranosyl-(1 --> 2)]-beta-D-glucopyranosyl}mabiogenin and 3-O-[alpha-L-rhamnopyranosyl-(1 --> 6)-beta-D-glucopyranosyl]mabiogenin, respectively.

References

elliptica
Trees of Mexico
Trees of the Caribbean
Flora of Florida
Trees of Central America
Trees of Venezuela